Biggenden is a rural town and locality in the North Burnett Region, Queensland, Australia.

Geography 

History

The name is derived from the Kabi word bigindhan meaning a place of stringybark.

Biggenden was founded in 1889 as a service centre to the short-lived goldrush towns of Paradise and Shamrock; and for coach passengers travelling west from Maryborough. The township, including the intriguingly named Live And Let Live Inn, moved to a new location alongside the railway station when the rail line arrived in 1891. Biggenden Post Office opened on 16 May 1891.

Biggenden Provisional school opened on 9 May 1892 becoming Biggenden State School in 1900. In January 1953, the school experimented with offering high school subjects by correspondence. In 1958, a secondary school section was added.

The Biggenden Methodist Church opened on Monday 23 May 1910. In 1977 through the amalgamation that created the Uniting Church in Australia, it became Biggenden Uniting Church.

In October 1928, the Biggenden branch of the Queensland Country Women's Association rooms were officially opened by J.C. Robertson, chairman of the Degilbo Shire Council.

Economy

The Mt Biggenden mine provided employment to the local community for over a hundred years, before its magnetite iron ore operation closed in 1999.

Primary production is the most significant industry in the Shire with beef and dairy cattle being predominant. Other agricultural pursuits include grain crops, piggeries, peanuts, citrus and timber. The area is also rich in minerals. Biggenden Mine is located eight kilometres out of town off Ban Ban Springs Road. Gold, bismuth and more recently magnetite have been extracted from the mine. The township is also close to Coalstoun Lakes National Park and Mount Walsh National Park.

Paradise Dam
In November 2005, the Queensland Government opened the Paradise Dam, about 30 minutes north-west of Biggenden, on the Burnett River. The 300,000ML dam, which submerges the former gold mining town of the same name, is touted as securing the future of the nearby Bundaberg and Childers region, although no water will be available for residents of the Biggenden area. However, more than 400 jobs were created during its construction and the dam site is proving to be one of the shire's largest tourist attraction. Artefacts and buildings removed from Paradise before the dam wall was built are now on display by the Biggenden Historical Society.

Amenities

Biggenden has a public library, swimming pool, bowling and golf club, memorial hall and showground.

The North Burnett Regional Council operates the Biggenden Library, located at 47 Edward Street, Biggenden.

The Biggenden branch of the Queensland Country Women's Association meets at the CWA Hall at 32 Edward Street.

Biggenden Uniting Church is at 32 George Street.

Education 
Biggenden State School is a government primary and secondary (Prep-10) school for boys and girls at Frederick Street. In 2017, the school had an enrolment of 143 students with 18 teachers (16 full-time equivalent) and 12 non-teaching staff (8 full-time equivalent).

Heritage listings 
Biggenden has a number of heritage-listed sites:

 8 Edward Street: former Biggenden Courthouse (now Biggenden Museum)
 11 Edward Street & Airstrip Road: former Biggenden Butter Factory
 32 Edward Street: Biggenden QCWA Building

See also

 Shire of Biggenden (1905–2008)

References

External links

 University of Queensland: Queensland Places: Biggenden and Biggenden Shire
A history of some mines of the Biggenden District - State Library of Queensland

Towns in Queensland
North Burnett Region
1889 establishments in Australia
Populated places established in 1889
Localities in Queensland